Darius Quimby is recognized as the first known law enforcement officer to be killed in the line of duty in the United States. Constable Quimby worked for the Albany County Constable's Office of New York. He was killed on January 3, 1791. He may have been an unpaid peace officer.

Constable Quimby was killed while attempting to arrest a man named Whiting Sweeting of Stephentown, New York on a trespassing warrant. A 1790 census lists a Darius in the family of Ephraim Quimby there and of an age eligible to be a constable. Sweeting was convicted of murdering Constable Quimby in the July session of the New York State Supreme Court and hanged on August 26, 1791.

References

Sources
http://www.odmp.org/officer/16907-constable-darius-quimby
https://web.archive.org/web/20090201171548/http://reservepolice.org/History_of_Reserves.htm
https://web.archive.org/web/20140710161814/http://www.villageofshorewood.org/index.asp?Type=B_BASIC&SEC=%7B679B50AE-E6F1-4332-BB6A-FB101F9E6173%7D

External links 
 
The narrative of Whiting Sweeting : who was executed at Albany, the 26th of August, 1791. : Containing, an account of his trial before the Supreme Court of Judicature of the state of New-York, at the July term, 1791, for the murder of Darius Quimby

1791 deaths
Male murder victims
Place of birth missing
Deaths by firearm in New York (state)
People murdered in New York (state)
Year of birth missing
People from Stephentown, New York
American police officers killed in the line of duty